Zdenko Jurčević (born December 2, 1985) is a Croatian footballer currently playing with Hamilton City SC of the Canadian Soccer League.

Club career 
Jurčević began his professional career with Habenhauser FV of the Bremen-Liga in 2007. In 2010, he returned to Croatia to play with NK Konavljanin in the Treća HNL. In 2011, he went abroad to Bosnia to sign with NK Vitez, and was transferred to HNK Tomislav in 2012. The following year he signed with HNK Čapljina of the First League of the Federation of Bosnia and Herzegovina. After a successful tenure with Čapljina he signed a contract with NK Istra 1961 of the Croatian First Football League. In 2015, he went overseas to Canada to sign with Brantford Galaxy of the Canadian Soccer League, where he finished as the club's top goalscorer with 21 goals. The following season he signed with Hamilton City SC.

References 

1985 births
Living people
People from Tomislavgrad
Association football midfielders
Croatian footballers
NK Vitez players
HNK Čapljina players
NK Istra 1961 players
Brantford Galaxy players
Hamilton City SC players
Second Football League (Croatia) players
First League of the Federation of Bosnia and Herzegovina players
Croatian Football League players
Canadian Soccer League (1998–present) players
Croatian expatriate footballers
Expatriate footballers in Bosnia and Herzegovina
Croatian expatriate sportspeople in Bosnia and Herzegovina
Expatriate soccer players in Canada
Croatian expatriate sportspeople in Canada